The Amateur Astronomer was a four-page bulletin published between 1929 and 1935 by the Amateur Astronomers Association of New York. C. S. Brainin was the first editor; a section called "Meteor Notes" was edited by Virginia Geiger starting in 1933.

In 1935, The Amateur Astronomer merged into The Sky published by the Hayden Planetarium. In 1941, The Sky merged with The Telescope to become Sky & Telescope, which has remained in print since then.

References

External links
 Web site of the Amateur Astronomers Association of New York

1929 establishments in New York (state)
1935 disestablishments in New York (state)
Amateur astronomy
Monthly magazines published in the United States
Science and technology magazines published in the United States
Astronomy magazines
Defunct magazines published in the United States
Magazines established in 1929
Magazines disestablished in 1935
Magazines published in New York City